Baruipara Union is a Union Parishad under Bagerhat Sadar Upazila of Bagerhat District in the division of Khulna, Bangladesh. It has an area of 40.71 km2 (15.72 sq mi) and a population of 39,553.

References

Unions of Bagerhat Sadar Upazila
Unions of Bagerhat District
Unions of Khulna Division